Aleksandrów  is a village in the sołectwo of Wąsosz, in the administrative district of Gmina Koniecpol, within Częstochowa County, Silesian Voivodeship, in southern Poland.

The village has a population of 120. There is also another Aleksandrów in the gmina, having sołectwo status.

References

Villages in Częstochowa County